Čataj is a village and municipality in western Slovakia in  Senec District in the Bratislava region.  This typical agricultural village has fewer than 1000 inhabitants and is located aside from major roads, roughly between Senec and Trnava.

Etymology
Čata: the archaic name for residents responsible for guarding the assigned area (in the modern Slovak čata: a squad). Chatey 1244, Czataj 1773. See also Čata in the Levice District.

History
Early archaeological digs show that people settled the area around Čataj as early as 5000 BC.  The town was mentioned for the first time in 1244, under the name "posesio Chatey".  In the next few centuries the town and surrounding lands were given as gifts to several different families loyal to the Hungarian crown.

In the 14th century, German colonists settled in Čataj, and until the 18th century the town was almost exclusively German.  During this period, the town built a Catholic rectory (1397) and a church in 1721.  Later, in 1845 the current church was built in Neoclassical style.  The church was repaired twice in the second half of the twentieth century, and along with a much newer Catholic Evangelical church serve the local community.

Culture and entertainment
Čataj is famous primarily for its ornamental embroidery of blouses and tablecloths.  These artworks have been sold all over the world, and one of them is said to have served as Pope John Paul II's tablecloth.  Folk art also survives in the form of two music bands, the brass band Čatajanka and the gypsy folk band Farkašovci, which have toured beyond the borders of Slovakia.  In addition, the village has a local folk dance group, Tulipán.

Due to its quiet and slow life and its agricultural character, Čataj has been often used as backdrops for movies and other art by movie directors Martin Slivka and Martin Ťapák, the cinematographer, photographer and folk art collector Karol Plicka and others.

In addition to folk art, the village organizes annual hunts and has a soccer team, which is regularly on the last place of Slovakia's lowest, sixth division of its soccer league.  The village also organizes numerous dances in its cultural center.

Demographics
In 2004 the town had 972 inhabitants: 471 men and 501 women.  99.1% were of Slovak ethnicity; the only two declared minorities were Hungarian and Czech.  64.3% of inhabitants were Roman Catholic, 24.8% Evangelical Catholic and 7.3% atheist.

Of the 314 houses in the village 261 were permanently inhabited

See also
 List of municipalities and towns in Slovakia

References

Genealogical resources

The records for genealogical research are available at the state archive "Statny Archiv in Bratislava, Slovakia"

 Roman Catholic church records (births/marriages/deaths): 1728-1895 (parish A)
 Lutheran church records (births/marriages/deaths): 1701-1896 (parish B)

External links

 Official page
Surnames of living people in Cataj

Villages and municipalities in Senec District
Archaeological sites in Slovakia